Laetesia raveni is a species of sheet weaver found in Queensland and New South Wales in Australia. It was described by Hormiga & Scharff in 2014.

References

Linyphiidae
Spiders of Australia
Arthropods of Queensland
Spiders described in 2014